Colombier is a municipality in the Canadian province of Quebec, located in the Côte-Nord region and the regional county municipality of La Haute-Côte-Nord.

It includes the population centres of (Sainte-Thérèse-de-) Colombier, Les Îlets-Jérémie, and Saint-Marc-de-Latour.

History
While some logging took place in the middle of the 19th century, real impetus to its development was due to the economic crisis of the 1930s, when government authorities encouraged resettlement of the unemployed by opening the area for agriculture. In 1932, Saint-Marc-de-Latour was formed with the construction of a sawmill. In 1935, the Parish of Sainte-Thérèse-des-Colombiers was formed. Also that year, pioneers set up 20 camps and built the road along the Saint Lawrence River. In 1937, the post office opened, then designated as Rivière-Colombier, named after the Colombier River, a tributary of the St. Lawrence that flows through the municipality.

In 1946, the Municipality of Colombier was formed, named after the river, which in turn was named after Charles-Roger des Colombiers (1628-1687), fur trader, citizen and alderman of Quebec, who had been granted a fief in that territory in 1677.

Demographics
Population trend:
 Population in 2016: 685 (2011 to 2016 population change: -8.3%)
 Population in 2011: 747 (2006 to 2011 population change: -8.6%)
 Population in 2006: 817
 Population in 2001: 890
 Population in 1996: 947
 Population in 1991: 973

Private dwellings occupied by usual residents: 343 (total dwellings: 376)

Mother tongue:
 English as first language: 1.8%
 French as first language: 96.3%
 English and French as first language: 0%
 Other as first language: 1.8%

See also
 List of municipalities in Quebec

References

External links
  Municipalité de Colombier

Municipalities in Quebec
Incorporated places in Côte-Nord
La Haute-Côte-Nord Regional County Municipality